Walter Scott "Steve" Brodie (September 11, 1868 – October 30, 1935) was an American professional baseball center fielder. He played in Major League Baseball from 1890 to 1902 for the Boston Beaneaters, St. Louis Browns, Baltimore Orioles (NL), Pittsburgh Pirates, Baltimore Orioles (AL), and New York Giants. Brodie set a 19th century record by playing in 727 consecutive games. In the mid-1890s, along with Willie Keeler and Joe Kelley, he was part of one of the best outfields of his era.

Early life
Brodie was the son of Irish immigrant Alexander Brodie, a tailor and a Shakespearean actor.  In 1887, Brodie moved to Roanoke, Virginia, where he played in the semiprofessional industrial leagues. That same year, Brodie, 18, met Carrie Henry, 15, and they got married. The couple lived in Roanoke through Brodie's baseball playing career.

Baseball career
Brodie took on the nickname Steve because of the daredevil of the same name, who was said to have survived a jump off of the Brooklyn Bridge. The ballplaying Brodie broke into the major leagues with the Boston Beaneaters in 1890; NL teams sought a high volume of new players that year because they had lost players who jumped to the new Players' League. In 1891, Brodie began a 727-game streak of consecutive games played, the longest such streak in the 19th century.

Brodie spent several years in the outfield with the Baltimore Orioles of the 1890s. His teammates in the outfield were two future Baseball Hall of Fame members, Willie Keeler and Joe Kelley, giving the Orioles one of the best outfields of the 19th century.

On the baseball field, Brodie was known as a jokester with an eccentric personality. Teammates and fans were sometimes taken aback when he recited Shakespearean verse during games or carried on conversations with himself in the outfield.

In 1438 games over 12 seasons, Brodie posted a .303 batting average (1728-for-5703) with 886 runs, 191 doubles, 89 triples, 25 home runs, 900 runs batted in, 289 stolen bases, 420 bases on balls, .365 on-base percentage, and .381 slugging percentage. He recorded a .958 fielding percentage primarily as an outfielder but also played several games at second and third base.

Later life
When the Federal League emerged as a third major league, Brodie became a scout for the Baltimore Terrapins. The YMCA sent him to France to facilitate recreation programs for U.S. soldiers in World War I. He later served as an administrator at Baltimore's Municipal Stadium. Brodie died in 1935 and was interred at Woodlawn Cemetery in Baltimore County.

See also
List of Major League Baseball single-game hits leaders

References

External links

1868 births
1935 deaths
19th-century baseball players
Major League Baseball center fielders
Boston Beaneaters players
St. Louis Browns (NL) players
Baltimore Orioles (NL) players
Pittsburgh Pirates players
Baltimore Orioles (1901–02) players
New York Giants (NL) players
Minor league baseball managers
Altoona (minor league baseball) players
Canton (minor league baseball) players
Wheeling National Citys players
Wheeling Nailers (baseball) players
Hamilton Hams players
Chicago White Stockings (minor league) players
Montreal Royals players
Worcester Riddlers players
Baltimore Orioles (IL) players
Troy Trojans (minor league) players
Binghamton Bingoes players
Providence Clamdiggers (baseball) players
Providence Grays (minor league) players
Newark Sailors players
Roanoke Tigers players
Trenton Tigers players
Birmingham Barons players
Portsmouth Truckers players
Norfolk Tars players
Newark Indians players
Baseball players from Virginia
People from Warrenton, Virginia